Robert Paxton (born 20 October 1983 in Isle of Wight) is a British former competitive pair skater. He competed with Erica Risseeuw. They are the 2009 & 2010 British silver medalists.

Competitive highlights
(with Risseeuw)

References
 
 

British male pair skaters
English male pair skaters
1983 births
Living people
Sportspeople from the Isle of Wight